XHCU-FM is a radio station on 104.5 FM in Cuautla, Morelos. It is owned by Grupo Audiorama Comunicaciones and carries a grupera format known as La Bestia Grupera.

History
XHCU received its concession on April 11, 1980. It was initially known as Estereo Armonía, until the purchase of the station by Radiorama in the 2000s, at which time it rebranded as La Tremenda. In 2013, when Radiorama and Audiorama split, the current La Bestia Grupera name was adopted.

References

Regional Mexican radio stations
Radio stations in Morelos